General Santos, officially the City of General Santos, and abbreviated as GenSan, is a 1st class highly urbanized city in the region of Soccsksargen, Philippines. According to the 2020 census, it has a population of 697,315 people.

It is located on the island of Mindanao, it is the southernmost and 15th-most populous city in the Philippines. It is the regional center for commerce and industry of the Soccsksargen region, and is geographically located within the province of South Cotabato but administered independently of it.

Formerly known as Dadiangas, the city was named after Gen. Paulino Santos, a former Commanding General of the Philippine Army and the settlement's leading pioneer.

History
The nomadic Blaan people are the original inhabitants of General Santos, and traces of their early settlement of the area are found in the city's place names, which are derived from their vocabulary. Their name for the city, Dadiangas, is from the thorny Ziziphus spina-christi tree that was once abundant in the area and is now a protected species under Republic Act 8371 or the Indigenous Peoples Right Act of 2007. The B'laan tribe now lives alongside the city's new generation of settlers and other immigrants.

Beforehand, the Blaan people would then be forced to move to the hills after the Muslims settle in the area under the rule of the Sultanate of Maguindanao.

After the fall of Maguindanao as a great power in Mindanao, Datu Uto of Buayan expanded his domain towards Sarangani Bay. Dadiangas would fall under the Sultanate of Buayan until the American era.

Waves of migration

Organized under the National Land Settlement Administration (NLSA) of the Commonwealth Government headed by President Manuel L. Quezon, General Paulino Santos led the relocation of 62 Christian settlers from Luzon to the shores of Sarangani Bay aboard the steam ship “Basilan” of Compañia Maritima on February 27, 1939. The 62 pioneers, mostly agricultural and trade graduates, were the first large batch of settlers to land in the area with the mission to industriously cultivate the region. After this first influx of pioneers, thousands more Christians from the Visayas and Luzon have subsequently moved into the area, gradually driving some of the resident B'laan to the mountains, who have lost their livelihood and somewhat displaced Maguindanaon living in the area.

In March 1939, the first formal settlement in the city was established in Alagao, which is now known as Barangay Lagao. Lagao district was known then as the "Municipal District of Buayan" under the jurisdiction of the deputy governor of the Municipal District of Glan. Until it officially became an independent Municipal District of Buayan on October 1, 1940, appointing Datu Sharif Zainal Abedin—an Arab mestizo married to a daughter of a very influential datu of lower Buayan—as the first district municipal mayor.

Second World War
During World War II, the Municipal District of Buayan become one of the last frontiers between the combined American and Filipino forces and troops from the Empire of Japan. Retreating Imperial Japanese forces made Klaja Karsts Land their last ground for defence, constructing round cement bunkers and tunnels. These bunkers can still be seen at Sitio Guadalupe; most of the tunnels, however, have since been damaged and even destroyed by treasure hunters and land developers.

Renaming and elevation to city status

A year after the Philippines regained full sovereignty from the United States on July 4, 1946, the Municipality of Buayan became a 4th class regular municipality by virtue of the Executive Order Number 82, dated August 18, 1947, by President Manuel Roxas, absorbing the Municipal District of Glan, whose low income bracket at the time disqualified it for the honour. Dadiangas was the seat of government for the Municipality of Buayan electing Irineo Santiago as its first Municipal Mayor on a local election that was held on November 11, 1947. Mayor Santiago was formally inducted on January 1, 1948.

Six years later, in June 1954, the Municipality of Buayan was renamed General Santos as a tribute to the leading pioneer via Act No. 1107 authored by Congressman Luminog Mangelen of Cotabato Province.

From 1963 to 1967, the municipality's economy experienced a boom under Mayor Lucio A. Velayo, as several large agri-based and multinational firms such as Dole Philippines, General Milling Corporation and UDAGRI expanded into the area. Although it was then qualified to become a fourth class city from being a municipality, the residents rejected a move by Congressman Salipada Pendatun to convert the Municipality of Buayan into a city and to rename it ’’Rajah Buayan’’.

On July 8, 1968, the Municipality of General Santos was converted into a city upon the approval of Republic Act No. 5412, authored by Congressman James L. Chiongbian. It was inaugurated on September 5 of that year, with Antonio C. Acharon became the new city's first mayor. On September 5, 1988, a decade after its inauguration as a chartered city, GenSan was declared a highly urbanized city of South Cotabato.

Even after becoming a highly urbanized city independent from South Cotabato in 1988, General Santos remained part of the province's congressional representation. The city only gained a separate representative with the passage of Republic Act No. 11243 on March 11, 2019, which segregated General Santos from the first congressional district of South Cotabato to be its 3rd congressional district. On September 15, 2021, House Bill No. 10021 authored by Representative Ferdinand Hernandez, that officially mandate General Santos as a lone district, separate from South Cotabato was passed on third and final reading.

Geography
General Santos lies at the southern part of the Philippines. The city is southeast of Manila, southeast of Cebu and southwest of Davao.

The city is bounded by municipalities of Sarangani Province, namely Alabel in the east, and Maasim in the south. General Santos is likewise bounded by the South Cotabato municipality of Polomolok and Sarangani Province municipality of Malungon in the north, and the municipality of T'boli in the west.

Climate

General Santos has a tropical wet and dry climate (Köppen climate classification).

Barangays

General Santos is politically subdivided into 26 barangays.

 Apopong
 Baluan
 Batomelong
 Buayan
 Bula
 Calumpang
 City Heights
 Conel
 Dadiangas East
 Dadiangas North
 Dadiangas South
 Dadiangas West
 Fatima
 Katangawan
 Labangal
 Lagao (1st & 3rd)
 Ligaya
 Mabuhay
 Olympog
 San Isidro (Lagao 2nd)
 San Jose
 Siguel
 Sinawal
 Tambler
 Tinagacan
 Upper Labay

Demographics

There are two major languages spoken in the city, with Cebuano being widely spoken and being used by the local media outlets in the city (television, radio, and newspapers), followed by Hiligaynon, which is used mainly by settlers who came from the provinces of South Cotabato, Sultan Kudarat, North Cotabato and Maguindanao, as well as immigrants from the provinces of Negros Occidental, Iloilo and Guimaras. Other languages spoken within the city include Blaan, Tboli, Maguindanao, Ilocano, and Kapampangan.

Religion
The predominant religion in the city is Christianity, with the largest denomination being the Catholic Church, comprising almost 90% of the population. About 9% of the population belongs to Islam, mostly Sunnites.

Economy

The city's major economic activity is primarily anchored in two sectors namely the agro-industry and fishing industry.
Agro-industry: Endowed with rich volcanic soil, ample and well distributed rainfall all throughout the year and a typhoon-free climate, General Santos produces export quality high valued crops such as corn, coconut, pineapple, asparagus, banana and rice. It also yields quality exotic fruits, vegetables and cut flowers. The city is also a top producer and exporter of quality livestock such as poultry, hogs, and cattle. But with the continuing growth in population and economy in the passing of time, a number of the city's agricultural lands have gradually been converted into built up areas in order to address the relatively growing need of dwelling and viable spaces.

Fishing industry: General Santos is the largest producer of sashimi-grade tuna in the Philippines. Thus, as early as 1970, it was nicknamed "Tuna Capital of the Philippines". GenSan also accounts for the second-largest daily total catch of fish in the country after Navotas in the National Capital Region. Locals in the city boast that fishes and seafoods do not come fresher than what is found in their locality. The fishing industry in GenSan yields a total daily capacity of 750 metric tons of fish catch, and employs about 7,800 workers. General Santos is home to seven tuna processing plants. The Fishport Complex in Barangay Tambler has a  quay and a  wharf for 2,000 GT reefer carriers. The fishport is equipped with modern facilities that comply with international standards on fish catch handling.

General Santos registered 1,365 new medium to large enterprises in 2011. An aggregate investment involved is estimated PHP 1.202 billion. Top industry for new investment in 2011 was as follows: Hotel and Restaurant-31%; Wholesale & Retail Trade-20%; Repair of Motor Vehicles, Motorcycles and Personal & Household Goods, Real Estate & Renting Business Activities-17%; Other Community, Social & Personal Services-8%; Financial Intermediation-5%; Manufacturing-5%; Fishing-3%; ICT-3 %

As of 2000, there are 59 banks serving the city. This composed of 46 commercial banks, 5 savings banks, 7 rural banks and 1 cooperative bank. Aside from this, there are 48 lending institutions as well as 49 pawnshops providing emergency loan assistance.

Shopping
General Santos is the shopping capital of the Soccksargen region. Residents from nearby towns and provinces visit the city to do shopping and enjoy life and leisure activities. There are several huge shopping malls in the city, notable ones are KCC Mall of Gensan, SM City General Santos, Robinsons Place GenSan, Gaisano Mall of GenSan, RD Plaza (Fitmart), Veranza Mall, and the newest addition to the city which is RD City Mall located at Barangay Mabuhay, Unitop Shopping Mall in Barangay Dadingas West and AllHome (soon in Barangay Katangawan, Circumferential Road). SM Savemore has two branches in the city and another branch will be built within the downtown area. There are also news about building an Ayala Mall and Puregold. These malls are home to both national and international brands of retail merchandises as well as restaurants and cafes. There are many merchandise and large groceries owned by local and foreign Chinese, Taiwanese and Korean businessmen in the city.

Infrastructure
Communication
Modern and state-of-the-art communication facilities at par with global standards are readily available and are provided in General Santos by major telecommunication companies in the country. These include voice, data, internet and network solutions, among others, in both wired and mobile forms.

Transportation
GenSan and the whole of Soccsksargen can be reached by air, land, or sea.

Air transportation

The General Santos International Airport is the largest airport in Mindanao. It has a 3,227-metre concrete runway capable of handling wide-bodied jets like Airbus A340 and Boeing 747. It was also called Rajah Buayan Airport in the 1990s, and Tambler Airport in 2008, before being renamed to its current name. Flights to and from Manila, Iloilo, and Cebu are currently being operated in the airport by Philippine Airlines and Cebu Pacific. General Santos International Airport is the second busiest airport in Mindanao and 9th busiest airport in the Philippines.

Sea transportation

The Makar Wharf is the main international sea port of the city and is one of the finest sea ports in the country. It is located in Barangay Labangal, away from the central business district. With a  docking length and a  width, the wharf can accommodate up to nine ship berthing positions all at the same time. The port is replete with modern facilities such as container yards, storage and weighing bridges.  Several shipping companies operate regular inter-island ferry service to and from other major ports in Luzon, Visayas and Mindanao. Negros Navigation, SuperFerry and Sulpicio Lines provide these inter-island shipping routes while numerous Indonesian shipping lines operate international ferry service between General Santos and neighboring ports in Indonesia carrying both passenger and cargo loads.

Land transportation
Commuting in and around General Santos is a fast and convenient ride. More than 400 passenger buses, public utility vans and jeepneys wield routes within the city and neighboring provinces like in Koronadal, Cotabato, Davao, Tacurong, Pagadian, Cagayan de Oro and others.  Three-wheeled motorized cabs known as tricycles are the city's main mode of public transport and have been on the road since the pioneering times. Air-conditioned taxis also ply the city streets offering commuters a choice of a more comfortable mode of transportation.

Maintained by the City Engineers' Office, the city's major road networks are paved and endowed with safety road marks, signs and signals to ensure a secure and efficient traffic flow within the city.  The Pan-Philippine Highway links the city by land to other major cities in Mindanao and to the rest of the country.

The General Santos Terminal—popularly known as Bulaong Terminal; located in Barangay Dadiangas North is the city's main integrated land transport terminal.  The terminal serves as the city's gateway for land travelers. Buses and other forms of public mass transportation—to and from various parts of Mindanao such as Koronadal, Tacurong, Cotabato, Davao, Kidapawan, Digos, Pagadian, and Cagayan de Oro.

Utilities
Power Majority of the city's power supply is being serviced by the second district of South Cotabato Electric Cooperative (SOCOTECO-II). The said power distributor acquires the majority of its power needs for the city's consumption from the National Transmission Corporation (TransCo) while other sources are drawn from various Independent Power Producers (IPP) from nearby power plants and barges.

Water Majority of the households and other entities in the city are provided and serviced with clean, safe and potable water supply from deep well sources by General Santos City Water District (GSCWD).  Potable water sources in other far flung and remote parts of the city where cannot be reached by the local water utility service are being served by their individual Barangay Water And Sanitation systems.

Waste management In a bid to achieve an efficient and sustainable management of non-hazardous waste the city produces every single day, the finalization and construction of the city's waste water treatment facility is currently underway at the corner of P. Acharon and I. Santiago Boulevards. The said location is adjacent to the city public market and is the former site of the city's Fish Landing. The facility will include settling ponds and anaerobic reactors, among others.

Likewise is the finalization stage for the construction of a multi-million peso solid waste management and disposal system in Barangay Sinawal. The new and modern solid waste management facility will replace the existing city dumpsite in Barangay Siguel.

Security and civil defense
The Philippine National Police, a military task force has been formed to protect the city from terrorist attacks and other crime. Task Force GenSan is affiliated with the Philippine Army and headed by an army colonel. 8 Police Stations are built on each barangay to keep the safeness and a peaceful order in city. Agencies and Organizations are forming a good and peaceful will to group an order in a city.

Health services
The average life expectancy of Gensanon is 70 for females and 65 for males. There are 19 hospitals, with more than 2,200 beds in the city including General Santos Doctors Hospital, St. Elizabeth Hospital, SOCSARGEN County Hospital, Mindanao Medical Center, R.O Diagan Cooperative Hospital, GenSan Medical Center, Sarangani Bay Specialists Medical Center, General Santos City District Hospital and the newly inaugurated Dadiangas Medical Center servicing a care for the people. In addition, there is an ongoing construction of ACE Medical Center to add more hospital bed capacity and medical services in the city.

Education

Aside from more than 50 Private Schools, such as The Quantum Academy, and more than 100 public schools, General Santos hosts three universities. These are the Notre Dame of Dadiangas University, Mindanao State University – General Santos City and New Era University – General Santos Branch. It also houses colleges such as the Doña Lourdes Institute of Technology.

Soon, the General Santos campus of the country's oldest academic institution, University of Santo Tomas, will rise in Barangay Ligaya.

Media
Notable media publications in the city are the SusStar General Santos, Periodiko Banat, Sapol, and other local newspapers. Brigada Newspaper General Santos is the most popular newspaper company in the city.

There are several television stations in the city that are owned and operated by broadcasting networks—ABS-CBN 3 Soccsksargen, GMA 8 Soccsksargen, TV5 Channel 12 Gensan, GMA News TV 26, ABS-CBN Sports+Action Channel 36, Brigada News TV 39. Most of these television networks reaches as far as Davao Region and Northern Mindanao; and caters the whole Soccsksargen Region. Major and other minor cable and satellite television companies are also operating in the city. Most of the FM and AM radio stations are operating in the city 24 hours a day such as MOR 92.7 General Santos, 89.5 Brigada News FM, iFM 91.9, 94.3 Yes! FM General Santos, Radyo5 97.5 News FM, K101.5 Love Radio GenSan, Barangay 102.3 GenSan and others.

There are three local newscasts programs in General Santos: TV Patrol Socsksargen (ABS-CBN 3 Soccsksargen), GMA Soccsksargen Flash Bulletin (GMA 8 Soccsksargen) now part as One Mindanao Flagship Newscast, Balita38 (EGTV Channel 46) and Ronda Brigada (Brigada News TV channel 39).

Notable personalities

 Sebastian Benedict (Baeby Baste) of Eat Bulaga!, child actor
 Gerald Anderson, actor
 Ethel Booba, TV personality
 Melai Cantiveros, actress
 Nonito Donaire, professional boxer
 Rolando Navarrete, professional boxer
 Jinkee Pacquiao, politician
 Manny Pacquiao, professional boxer
 Bo Perasol, head coach UAAP basketball of Ateneo de Manila University Blue Eagles
 Shamcey Supsup, Miss Universe 2011 Pageant 3rd Runner-up and National Director of Miss Universe Philippines
 Zendee Rose Tenerefe, singer, YouTube personality
 Racso Jugarap, international artist
 XB Gensan, dance group, Grand Champion, Showtime Season 1

Sister cities

Local
 Quezon City, since October 12, 1994
 Iloilo City
 Naga City, Camarines Sur
Cotabato City

International
  Canberra, Australia
  Jersey City, USA
  Monterrey, Mexico
  Hadano, Kanagawa, Japan

Gallery

See also

 List of renamed cities and municipalities of the Philippines

Notes

References

External links

 
 General Santos Profile at the DTI Cities and Municipalities Competitive Index
 [ Philippine Standard Geographic Code]

 
Cities in South Cotabato
Highly urbanized cities in the Philippines
Port cities and towns in the Philippines
Planned cities in the Philippines
Populated places established in 1939
1939 establishments in the Philippines
Establishments by Philippine executive order